Gojković (Cyrillic script: Гојковић) is a Serbian patronymic surname derived from the masculine given name Gojko. It may refer to:

Duško Gojković (born 1931), jazz musician
Predrag Gojković (1932–2017), singer
Maja Gojković (born 1963), politician
Janko Gojković (born 1973), swimmer
Jovan Gojković (1975–2001), footballer
Vladimir Gojković (born 1981), water polo player
Aleksandar Gojković (born 1988), footballer

Serbian surnames
Patronymic surnames